Álvaro Tauchert Soler (born 9 January 1991) is a Spanish-German singer. He rose to prominence across Europe and Latin America with his 2015 hit "El Mismo Sol", primarily hitting success in Italy, Switzerland and Mexico. A special bilingual Spanish-English version of "El mismo sol", featuring Jennifer Lopez, was also recorded for international release in the United States, in the United Kingdom, and worldwide. His follow up single "Sofia" in 2016 also achieved chart success in European countries, reaching number 1 in Poland, Italy, the Czech Republic, Slovakia, Belgium and Switzerland. Soler has released three studio albums, 
Eterno Agosto in 2015, Mar de Colores in 2018, and Magia in 2021. His single "La Cintura" taken from his second album has become a pan-European hit for him.

Biography 
Born in Sant Cugat del Vallès to a German father and to a Spanish-Belgian mother, he became multilingual at a young age. He moved with his parents to Japan at age 10, staying there until age 17. He took piano lessons very early there. Returning to Barcelona, in 2010 he established the musical band Urban Lights alongside his brother and some friends. The band continued performing music described as a mixture of British pop, indie pop and electronic music building following locally. They won a university music contest and the band appeared in 2013 on the Spanish music casting contest ¡Tú sí que vales! reaching the Final 8. They released some materials and self-produced album. Soler also pursued studies in industrial design at Escuela de Grafismo Elisava.
  
Soler decided to drop the Urban Lights band in 2014- to go solo establishing himself as a musical artist based in Germany. Based in Berlin, he released his single "El mismo sol" co-written by Soler, Yasmin Gabriel, Ali Zuckowski, Simon Triebel and John Speaks (from the band Juli) and produced by Triebel. The song released on 24 April 2015 became initially a huge hit in Italy reaching number one on the Italian FIMI and certified double platinum. It also made it to number one on the Swiss Swiss Hitparade singles chart.

Based on this success, Soler released his debut solo album Eterno Agosto on 23 June 2015 on Universal Music.
In 2016, Soler was chosen as a judge on the tenth series of Italian talent show X Factor. Alongside being nominated for awards, Soler performed his recently released single on the Latin American Music Awards on 6 October 2016 alongside Mexican actress/singer Lucero.
Soler released a version of his song "Libre" in 3 language versions with: Mexican singer Paty Cantú, Polish singer Monika Lewczuk and Italian singer Emma Marrone.
He also collaborated with Morat, performing in the song "Yo contigo, tú conmigo" for the film Despicable Me 3, or Gru, mi villano favorito 3 in Spanish. The videoclip was released on 16 June 2017.
Soler was also the voice of Camilo Madrigal in the Italian and German dubbed versions of the 2021 Disney film Encanto.
He is a polyglot, speaking Spanish, Catalan, German, English, Italian, French and Japanese.

Discography

Studio albums

Compilation albums

Extended plays

Singles

Other appearances

Songwriter

Awards and nominations

Notes

References

External links

 Official website
 
 
 
 

21st-century Spanish male singers
21st-century Spanish singers
Singers from Catalonia
German songwriters
Songwriters from Catalonia
Living people
Singers from Barcelona
1991 births
Spanish people of German descent
Folk-pop singers
21st-century German  male singers
German people of Spanish descent
Spanish expatriates in Japan
Spanish people of Belgian descent